Pasqua Rosée was a 17th-century servant who opened the first coffee-house in London and possibly Britain. He was born into the ethnic Greek community of the Republic of Ragusa (now southernmost Croatia). In 1651 he became the servant of Daniel Edwards, an English merchant of the Levant Company who was living in Smyrna in the Ottoman Empire (now Turkey); part of Rosée's duties included preparing and serving his daily coffee.

In late 1651 Edwards returned to Smyrna, taking Rosée with him. The number and frequency of friends visiting Edwards to drink coffee with him disrupted his social life, and he set up Rosée as the proprietor of a coffee-house near the Royal Exchange. As he was not a freeman of the City of London he was not able to trade; accordingly Edwards made his father-in-law's former apprentice, Christopher "Kitt" Bowman, a freeman of the City, join Rosée as a partner. The last known reference to Rosée was in 1658, after which Bowman ran the coffee-house with his wife until his death in 1662. There are stories that Rosée left London for a misdemeanour and that he went to Holland or Germany to sell coffee, although there is no evidence this was the case.

The number of coffee-houses grew rapidly after Rosée opened his outlet. By 1708 there were 500–600 in London and Westminster—and others in provincial cities. The original premises of the coffee-house were destroyed in the 1666 Great Fire of London. On its location in the 21st century is a pub, the Jamaica Wine House; a commemorative plaque is now on the spot, unveiled in 1952—the tercentenary of Rosée's shop.

Biography

Pasqua Rosée was born in the early seventeenth century into the ethnic Greek community of the Republic of Ragusa (now southernmost Croatia), and is variously described as Greek, Armenian, Turkish and "of Greek or Turkish origin". Little is known about his early life, but it is thought he spoke at least three languages: Greek, Turkish and English.

By 1651 Rosée was living in Smyrna in the Ottoman Empire (now Turkey), where he became the servant of Daniel Edwards, an English merchant of the Levant Company. English merchants preferred to employ Levantine servants as they were cheaper than those from England and had better knowledge of the local languages and customs. Rosée's language skills made him an important aid for Edwards in business, and he acted as "a clerk of accounts, a translator and a social diplomat, using his knowledge of Turkish customs to smooth the path of commerce"; he also acted in a personal capacity as Edwards's valet and coachman. While Edwards's servants prepared and served his food, as his valet, Rosée prepared and served his coffee.

Edwards left Smyrna in late 1651 to return to England; he was accompanied by Rosée. The reason the pair left was that either Edwards had thwarted activities of a Royalist cadre in the Levant Company in 1647 and 1650, or because of an outbreak of plague in the region, which reached Smyrna in September 1651. According to the historian Markman Ellis, "Edwards brought some characteristics of Levantine merchants: hard work, Puritan politics and coffee drinking". According to one of Edwards's friends, it was known he "drank two or three dishes [of coffee] at a time, twice or thrice a day". Friends would visit Edwards frequently to share his coffee and socialise; so many visited and drank the coffee that it impacted his family life, and in 1652 he decided to set up a coffee-house. As the rules of the Levant company meant he was unable to open it himself, he set up Rosée in business.

Edwards and Rosée selected a premises on St Michael's Alley, just off Cornhill and near the Royal Exchange. The lanes and alleys around the Exchange—a favoured place for merchants to meet daily—were busy with traders, lawyers, tavern keepers and the general public. The first incarnation of their coffee-house was a shed resembling a market stall on the edge of the churchyard of St Michael's Church. A sign hung over his stall, described either as "an image of himself dressed in some Levantine clothing", or a sign portraying his head.

To promote his enterprise, in 1652 Rosée published a handbill advertising The Vertue of the Coffee Drink in which he extolled the benefits of coffee, claiming "It is excellent to prevent and cure the dropsy, gout and scurvy", as well as scrofula, miscarriages and "a most excellent remedy against the spleen, hypocondriack winds and the like". This was the earliest-known advertisement for coffee. The launch of the new product onto the London market was aided by the politics of the day, with puritans attacking the sale of wine and beer as being connected to the profligate and licentious activities of the royalists. Taverners and wine merchants bemoaned the falling sales of their products in 1651 and 1652, and Rosée's positioning of coffee as a healthy and sober drink helped the product become commercially successful. One contemporary estimated that Rosée's turnover was 30 or 40 shillings a day – approximately £450 to 600 a year.

Markman Ellis considers the estimate is "probably overstated", although Rosée's business was successful enough to generate jealousy from local tavern owners; they petitioned the Lord Mayor of London on the basis that Rosée was not a Freeman of the City of London, and therefore should not be able to trade as he did. To overcome the barrier to Rosée's continuing trading, Edwards turned to his father-in-law, Alderman Thomas Hodges, who proposed one of his former apprentices, Christopher "Kitt" Bowman, a freeman of the City, to join Rosée as a partner, which took place in 1654.

In 1656 Rosée and Bowman moved from their shed into premises, also in St Michael's Alley, which measured ; the property was in poor condition, needing repairs and the men paid an annual rent of £4. The two men operated in partnership until at least 1658 (when they were both listed in the churchwardens' accounts), but Rosée seems to have no part in the joint venture after that. The two men also ran competing coffee-houses on opposite sides of the street, which was remembered in doggerel verse under the name Adrianus del Tasso:

Pull courage, Pasqua, fear no Harms,
From the beseiging Foe;
Make good your ground, stand to your Arms,
Hold out this summer, and then tho'
He'll storm, he'll not prevail—your Face
Shall give the Coffee Pot the chace.

There are no records relating to Rosée after 1658. The apothecary and writer John Houghton, writing in 1699, said that Rosée disappeared from London "for some misdemeanour", although no record or evidence for the misdemeanour has been found. There were claims that he left England and sold coffee in Holland in 1664 or Germany, but there is no evidence to support either claim.

Legacy
 
Bowman continued to run the coffee-house until 1662, when he died of tuberculosis. His widow continued to run the coffee-house until at least May 1663, when hers was one of seven coffee-houses in the Cornhill ward. The original closely built wooden buildings on St Michael's Avenue were destroyed in the 1666 Great Fire of London, although the stone-built church survived.

Rosée's was only the first of many coffee-houses in London. In 1659 a Covent Garden barber wrote that there was seemingly coffee sold "in almost every street". Increasingly they became, as Markham Ellis writes, "firmly associated with the tumultuous political culture of the Commonwealth." In the early years of the growth of coffee-houses, there was opposition from local tavern keepers, who complained to the Lord Mayor of London about the number of non-Freemen of the city involved in the trade, and in December 1675, after the restoration of the monarchy, Charles II issued "A proclamation for the Suppression of Coffee-Houses", which withdrew all licences to sell coffee; the resulting uproar meant the proclamation was withdrawn. No precise figures exist, but by 1708 coffee-houses were found in London—with 500–600 in London and Westminster—and several provincial cities, and in 1739, the London Directories listed 551. 

Rosée's sign was copied and imitated by several other coffee-houses and taverns across Britain. In his 1963 study of London coffee-houses from 1652 to 1900, the historian Bryant Lillywhite identified over fifty outlets using a sign comprising a Turk's head.

After he left the coffee-house, Rosée's reputation remained in the popular memory. He was the inspiration for a character in Knavery in all Trades, a play written by John Tatham in 1664, and he was the target of the satire A Broad-Side Against Coffee.

A pub, the Jamaica Wine House, now occupies the location of Rosée's outlet in St Michael's Alley. In 1952 the Lord Mayor of London, Sir Leslie Boyce, unveiled a plaque on the location, in celebration of the tercentenary of Rosée's shop.

First coffee-house
Markham Ellis writes that while several sources state that Rosée's coffee-house was the first in London but the second in England, he considers this erroneous and that Rosée's "was the first in Christendom". The source of the coffee-house in Oxford, Ellis states, is from the Oxford antiquarian Anthony Wood who wrote in "Secretum Antonii" (1671) that "Jacob a Jew opened a coffey (sic) house at the Angel in the parish of S. Peter, in the East Oxon". Wood left the reference undated, but the editor of his work, Andrew Clark, dated it to March 1650 or 1651. Wood's diaries state that coffee was consumed in private in 1650 in Oxford and that it was "publickly solde at or neare the Angel within the East Gate of Oxon ... by an outlander or a Jew" at some point between August 1654 and April 1655.

Notes and references

Notes

References

Sources

Books

Journals and magazines

News sources

Websites
 

Businesspeople in coffee
17th-century Greek people
Interlopers (business)
Greek emigrants to England
Businesspeople from London